Saint Benedict's College was a Catholic secondary school and sixth form college located in Garston, Liverpool, England. The school was coeducational from years 7 to 11 and included sixth form.

History
Saint Benedict's College was opened in 1955 under the name 'Blessed John Almond' in recognition of local martyr John Almond who was an Allerton resident. In 1971 it was renamed Saint John Almond, this followed John Almond being made a Saint by Pope John Paul II.

Notable former pupils
 Gillian Kearney, actress who played Debbie McGrath in Brookside.

References 

Defunct schools in Liverpool
Defunct Catholic schools in the Archdiocese of Liverpool
Educational institutions established in 1955
Educational institutions disestablished in 2010
1955 establishments in England
2010 disestablishments in England